Kim Se-hee (born 28 November 1995) is a two-time gold medal-winning Modern Pentathlete from South Korea.

A keen swimmer in her youth, Kim Se-hee's running skills gained her coach's attention during high school and she was later encouraged to try her hand at Modern Pentathlon. Initially attracted by the opportunity to learn 5 sports, she soon excelled, achieving a silver medal at the 2018 Asian Games  and a gold medal at the same event the following year. 

2021 saw the athlete win yet another gold medal  alongside Changwan Seo in the Mixed Relay race at the 2021 Pentathlon and Laser Run World Championship held in Cairo, Egypt. This victory helped secure her place on the world's stage, representing Korea at the 2020 Tokyo Olympic Games .

After the race in Cairo, Se-hee declared: ”I am very happy to have won a gold medal at the World Championships, the last game before the Olympics, and I will do my best to achieve good results at the Tokyo Olympics.” 

Speaking about her athletic ambitions, she said: “At first, to be remembered as a hard worker was my goal. But now I want to be a historical Modern Pentathlete.”

References

External links 
 

Living people
1995 births
Place of birth missing (living people)
South Korean female modern pentathletes
Asian Games medalists in modern pentathlon
Modern pentathletes at the 2018 Asian Games
Asian Games silver medalists for South Korea
Medalists at the 2018 Asian Games
World Modern Pentathlon Championships medalists
Modern pentathletes at the 2020 Summer Olympics
20th-century South Korean women
21st-century South Korean women
Olympic modern pentathletes of South Korea